Maria Viganò (was known as Maria Medina or Madame Salvatore Viganò; 1769-1821) was an Austrian ballet dancer, a wife of Salvatore Viganò. She was engaged at the Wiener Hofoper and internationally famous in her time. She introduced a reform in European ballet when she introduced the flesh-colored ballet costume, giving the impression of performing in the nude, which caused a sensation.

References 

 Vigano, Maria Josefa in: Bilderlexikon der Erotik, Bd. 1, Wien & Leipzig 1928, S. 880

1769 births
1821 deaths
18th-century Austrian ballet dancers
19th-century ballet dancers